Gav Godar may refer to:
 Gav Godar, Hamadan
 Gav Godar, Markazi